Gunnar Johan Åhs (5 September 1915, Uppsala – 6 May 1994) was a Swedish bobsledder who competed from the early 1950s to the early 1960s. He won a bronze medal in the four-man event at the 1961 FIBT World Championships in Lake Placid, New York.

Competing in two Winter Olympics, Åhs earned his best finish of seventh in the four-man event at Oslo in 1952.

Four years later he finished 16th in the four-man event at the 1956 Winter Olympics.

He was born in Uppsala and died in Johanneshov.

References
Bobsleigh four-man result: 1948-64
Bobsleigh four-man world championship medalists since 1930
Wallenchinsky, David (1984). "Bobsled: Four-man". In The Complete Book of the Olympics: 1896-1980. New York: Penguin Books. p. 561.

1915 births
1994 deaths
Sportspeople from Uppsala
Swedish male bobsledders
Olympic bobsledders of Sweden
Bobsledders at the 1952 Winter Olympics
Bobsledders at the 1956 Winter Olympics
20th-century Swedish people